The 2022–23 CEV Champions League is the 64th edition of the highest level European volleyball club competition organised by the European Volleyball Confederation.

Qualification

Pools composition
Drawing of Lots was held on 16 September 2022 in Brussels.

League round
 20 teams compete in the League round.
 The teams are split into 5 groups, each one featuring four teams.
 The top team in each pool automatically qualifies for the quarterfinals.
 All 2nd placed teams and the best 3rd placed team qualify for the playoffs.
 The remaining 3rd placed teams will compete in the quarterfinals of the 2022–23 CEV Cup.
All times are local.

Pool A

|}

|}

Pool B

|}

|}

Pool C

|}

|}

Pool D

|}

|}

Pool E

|}

|}

Third place ranking

|}

Playoff 6
 The winners of the ties qualify for the quarterfinals.
 In case the teams are tied after two legs, a Golden Set is played immediately at the completion of the second leg.
All times are local.

|}

First leg
|}

Second leg
|}

Quarterfinals
 The winners of the ties qualify for the semifinals.
 In case the teams are tied after two legs, a Golden Set is played immediately at the completion of the second leg.
All times are local.

|}

First leg
|}

Second leg
|}

Semifinals
 The winners of the ties qualify for the final.
 In case the teams are tied after two legs, a Golden Set is played immediately at the completion of the second leg.
All times are local.

|}

First leg
|}

Second leg
|}

Final
 Place: Turin
 Time: Central European Summer Time (UTC+02:00).

|}

Final standings

Attendance

League round

Notes

References

External links
 CEV Champions League Volley

CEV Champions League
CEV Champions League
CEV Champions League
CEV